Ahmed bin Saif Al Nahyan (Arabic: أحمد بن سيف آل نهيان; born 7 November 1963) is a member of the Al Nahyan family in the United Arab Emirates and the founder and was the chairman of Etihad Airways.

Early life, education, and career
Sheikh Ahmed Bin Saif Al Nahyan is a member of the ruling family of Abu Dhabi. Born in Al Ain in 1966, Shiekh Ahmed graduated from United Arab Emirates University in Al Ain. He went on to complete his master's degree at the University of Southern California and gained a doctorate degree in Egypt. Sheikh Ahmed Bin Saif is a member of the Abu Dhabi Executive Council and was Chairman of Abu Dhabi Aircraft Technologies, a post he has held since 2001. Currently, chairman of Rotana Jet Aviation.

Prior to his career at Etihad Airways, in 1992, Ahmed was the under-secretary of Abu Dhabi's Civil Aviation Authority. From 2001 to 2009 he was the Chairman of GAMCO. In addition, for a period of one year (2007–2008) he was also the Chairman of the Department of Civil Aviation, Abu Dhabi. 
He is also a former CEO of Gulf Air from January 1996 until December 2000. Furthermore, he is a qualified commercial captain, flying Airbus 340 and Boeing 767 of Gulf Air. Moreover, he also trained pilots in the UAE armed forces on Boeing 767s and flew C130s in the air force of the United Arab Emirates.

He received the prestigious 'Innovation in Business' award at a ceremony held at the Future Capitals World Summit in Abu Dhabi in January 2009.
"The growth during 2008, Etihad's fifth year of operations, saw passenger numbers total 6,021,931 and the average seat factor rise from 68% to 75%. The airline has also taken delivery of nine new aircraft boosting its fleet to a total of 42.

Etihad launched six new routes in 2008 – Beijing, Minsk, Almaty, Kozhikode, Chennai and Moscow – as well as signing a record order of $43bn at the Farnborough International Airshow for up to 205 Airbus and Boeing aircraft. 

Etihad's Chairman along with the airline's CEO, James Hogan, signed one of the largest aircraft orders in commercial aviation history in July at the Farnborough air show in the UK for up to 205 aircraft in a deal worth $43bn, at list prices."(1)

He set up Etihad Airways in 2003 and held the post of chairman until May 2009. During his chairmanship Etihad Airways received numerous awards.(2) Additionally, captain Ahmed Bin Saif is currently flying the Airbus A319 of Rotana Jet.

He was a member of Executive Council of Abu Dhabi.

References

External links
   

1963 births
Living people
Ahmed Bin Saif
Emirati airline chief executives
Emirati aviators
United Arab Emirates University alumni
University of Southern California alumni